Parnassius maximinus is a high-altitude butterfly which is found in western ranges of the Tien Shan Mountains. It is a member of the snow Apollo genus (Parnassius) of the swallowtail family (Papilionidae). Previously it was regarded as conspecific with P. delphius.

Description
It is larger than P. delphius. Its submarginal spots are heavy and contiguous. The hindwing is almost without a marginal band, but with two very large blue-centred anal spots and two likewise blue scaled.

References

Weiss, J.-C. 1992. The Parnassiinae of the World, Part 2. Sciences Nat, Venette; 87 pp.

Further reading
sv:Parnassius maximinus on Swedish Wikipedia - further references and synonymy

External links
Parnassius of the World - Text, range map and photos
Pteron Japanese text and photos

maximinus
Butterflies described in 1891